Burrowsville is an unincorporated community in Prince George County, Virginia, United States.  It is located on James River Drive. The community takes its name from the Burrow family who settled in the area during colonial period and whose many descendants still live in Burrowsville.

It is the location of Brandon Plantation, and Upper Brandon Plantation, both, U.S. National Historic Landmarks, as well as the historic Willow Hill Plantation, and Martin's Brandon Church, listed on the National Register of Historic Places.

References

 
It would be nice to maybe think of adding Salem Methodist Church in Burrowsville Va also. It has a long history with many well known people buried there from years ago it's on route 10.right on the heart of Burrowsville.

Unincorporated communities in Prince George County, Virginia
Unincorporated communities in Virginia